Charles Hilton Mammie is a Sierra Leonean professional basketball player who last played for the Pilipinas MX3 Kings in the ASEAN Basketball League. In December 2015, Mammie, along with Emmerson Oreta, Sunday Salvacion, Adrian Celada, Jondan Salvador, and Chad Alonzo, were released by the Pilipinas MX3 Kings after a roster overhaul. He was later replaced by Shaun Pruitt.

Collegiate career
He was recruited by the University of the East after a stint with the Arellano Chiefs.

References

Living people
1992 births
UE Red Warriors basketball players
Arellano University alumni
Sierra Leonean men's basketball players
Centers (basketball)
Sierra Leonean expatriate basketball people in the Philippines
ASEAN Basketball League players